Ficus albert-smithii is a species of plant in the family Moraceae. It is found in Brazil, Colombia, Guyana, Peru, and Venezuela.

References

albert-smithii
Least concern plants
Trees of Peru
Taxonomy articles created by Polbot